Yelich is an Americanized spelling of the Croatian and Serbian surname, Jelić.  Notable people with the surname include:

Christian Yelich (born 1991), American baseball player of Serbian descent
Lynne Yelich (born 1953), Canadian politician of Croatian descent
Sonja Yelich (born 1965), New Zealand poet of Croatian descent
Ella Yelich-O'Connor (born 1996), New Zealand singer of Croatian descent, better known as Lorde

See also
 Jelić

References

Croatian surnames